Nancy Grant is a French-Québécois Canadian film producer. She was born in the small village of Petit-Matane, on the Gaspé Peninsula in the north of Quebec, Canada. She has produced multiple projects with several Quebec filmmakers including Maxime Giroux, Xavier Dolan, Denis Côté, and Anne Émond. Her recent productions include Tom at the Farm (2013), Mommy (2014), and Félix et Meira (2014), which have received numerous awards at institutions including the Toronto International Film Festival, Alfred Bauer Berlin International Film Festival, Academy Awards, and Cannes Film Festival.

In 2014, she was awarded Best Motion Picture for Mommy at the Canadian Screen Awards.

Career 
Grant went to McGill University in Montreal, Canada in the early 2000s, studying psychology and international development.  She graduated in 2005, and shortly after realized her true passion of cinema. With Sylvain Corbeil, she founded Metafilms in Montreal in 2003. She is attracted to filmmakers with an individual voice whom she can support in long-term and frequent collaborations, including directors Xavier Dolan and Maxime Giroux.

Grant co-owns the production company Sons of Manual with director Xavier Dolan.

Tom a la ferme 
Grant took the main stage when she collaborated with Xavier Dolan in 2012. They have created 3 films together since then. Their first project was Tom at the Farm (Tom à la ferme) in 2013, a film based on the play by Michel Marc Bouchard. It was a part of the main screen competition at the 70th Venice International Film Festival, in the special presentation at the 2013 Toronto International Film Festival, and was a leading nominee for the 2014 Canadian Screen Awards. The psychological thriller follows Tom (played by Dolan himself), a man who has suddenly lost his lover Guillaume, to a remote country home for the funeral where Guillaume's family expects a woman in his place. He decides to keep his relations with Guillaume a secret, but finds himself in an unexpected game with Guillaume's aggressive and curious brother. The film was generally well received as a Hitchcockian Montreal psychological drama thriller, especially in its use of suspense and secrets with country landscapes. Some criticized the film for what they saw as Dolan's self-obsession, as he held the roles of screenwriter, director, co-producer, editor and actor. The film was nominated for 8 awards at the Canadian Screen Awards, and for two at the Venice Film Festival, where it won the prestigious FIPRESCI Award.

Mommy 
Dolan and Grant continued to collaborate. Shortly after their first project, they produced College Boy, a music video for the French rock band Indochine. Afterwards in 2014, they embarked on Mommy. It is a story of a recently widowed mother and her sometimes violent son with ADHD as they try to cope with their new life. A new neighbor offers her help as the family searches for hope and balance. 90% of both critics and audiences raved about the film and Dolan's authentic style; "Dolan loves close-ups and he gives his actors every chance to demonstrate their talent for ringing the emotional changes in a single take". The film was shot in a square 1:1 ratio. Dolan said of the choice, "I just wanted to shoot portrait aspect ratio that would allow me to be very close to characters, avoid distractions to the left and right of the frame and have the audience look the characters right in the eye". The film has become one of the greatest successes in Québécois cinema in the past decades, receiving over 29 awards internationally.

Grant and Dolan already have another project in progress, Dolan's first English-language film The Death and Life of John F. Donovan, a "showbiz satire with a big-name cast: Jessica Chastain, Kit Harington, Susan Sarandon, and Kathy Bates".

Félix et Meira 
While Grant was producing Mommy, she was also producing Felix and Meira, directed by Maxime Giroux. Inspired by a neighborhood Giroux used to live in with a large Hasidic Jewish population, it is an unconventional romance between a young man mourning his dying father and a young Hasidic wife a few blocks away. It was selected to represent Canada as a nomination for Best Foreign Language Film at the 88th Academy Awards. Most critics and audiences praised the film for its sensitive depiction of the Hasidic community. It was an authentic depiction of Giroux's former community, with English, French and Yiddish spoken onscreen. The actors were former Hasidic Jews that have left the community, a choice often viewed as courageous. "I learned a lot about my city, the community I live in and [myself] also. And I think that's why I go to the cinema and I think that's why I live — to learn more about other people." The film was produced in indie fashion; it did not have secure funding while filming but the crew still chose to work. "We were shooting it with $500,000, that's it, and we shot in Venice, Italy, and in Brooklyn", explains Grant about producing Félix et Meira at the same time as Mommy. The film had its world premiere at Toronto International Film Festival, where it won the prestigious Best Canadian Film award, beating Mommy among other films.

Filmography

Awards and nominations 
Grant won the Best Film award at the 17th Jutra Awards for her production of Mommy. The film was included in Canada's Top Ten feature films of 2014 selected by filmmakers and industry professionals at TIFF. She was also awarded the 2014 CMPA Feature Film Producer's Award.

References

External links 

Film producers from Quebec
Living people
People from Matane
Canadian women film producers
Year of birth missing (living people)